"Every Christian Lion Hearted Man Will Show You" is a song written by Barry, Robin & Maurice Gibb released by the Bee Gees in 1967 on their album Bee Gees' 1st. It was released as the B-side to "Holiday" in the US, Australia and Canada.

The song was revived in concert by Barry Gibb on his 2013-14 Mythology tour.

Recording

This track was recorded on March 23, 1967 along with "Please Read Me", "In My Own Time" and the unreleased track "Life". It was also released as the B-side of "Holiday" in Australia in October 1967 and US in September 1967. Though it was not released as a single anywhere, it appeared on the 1969 compilation  Best of Bee Gees.

Maurice Gibb talks about the mellotron on this track: "We started off with a mellotron and we used that on "Every Christian Lion Hearted Man Will Show", I had to repeat that on stage, but I used an organ".

The Bee Gees denied rumours that the Beatles performed on this record.

Musical structure

The introduction of the song features the line Oh solo dominique chanted by Robin four times - this motif also features after each chorus. The verses are sung by Barry whose electric rhythm guitar features prominently. Music critic Bruce Eder describes this track as "close in spirit to the Moody Blues of this era, opening with a Gregorian chant backed by a mellotron, before breaking into a strangely spaced-out, psychedelic main song body."

Personnel
 Barry Gibb - lead and harmony vocal, rhythm guitar
 Maurice Gibb - bass guitar, organ, mellotron
 Robin Gibb - harmony vocal
 Colin Petersen - drums
 Vince Melouney - lead guitar
 Bill Shepherd - orchestral arrangement

Cover versions
Australian singer Johnny Young released it on his LP Surprises.
The Flaming Lips recorded this song as an intro to their early live versions of "Shine on Sweet Jesus" as documented on the compilation, 20 Years of Weird: Flaming Lips 1986-2006.
 The Posies recorded the song and it appeared on several bonus/promotional discs in 1996. 
 LA based band Goon Moon on their second release Licker's Last Leg in 2007.
 Catherine included a version on their album Sorry! in 1994.

References

1967 songs
Bee Gees songs
Songs written by Barry Gibb
Songs written by Robin Gibb
Songs written by Maurice Gibb
Song recordings produced by Robert Stigwood
Johnny Young songs
The Flaming Lips songs